"In the Misty Moonlight"  is a song written by Cindy Walker. One of the first singers to record the song in 1964 was Jim Reeves: it is included on his posthumous album The Jim Reeves Way. There also have been many other artists who have covered the song, but the two most successful versions were recorded by Dean Martin and Jerry Wallace. Wallace's version had a #19 hit on the Billboard Top 100 when his version was released in 1964. Martin's version was released as a single in 1967 and went to number one on the Easy Listening chart and number forty-six on the Billboard Hot 100. The song was Martin's fifth and final number one on the Easy Listening chart.

See also
List of number-one adult contemporary singles of 1968 (U.S.)

Other versions
Bill Anderson
Kitty Wells
Slim Whitman
Skeeter Davis 
Eddy Arnold
Jerry Wallace
Brook Benton
B. J. Thomas
Faron Young
Marty Wood
Hank Snow
Lloyd Green (instrumental)
Dean Martin

References

1967 singles
Dean Martin songs
Songs written by Cindy Walker